Emma Watson (born 1990) is an English actress.

Emma Watson may also refer to:

 Emma Watson (footballer) (born 2006), Scottish footballer
 Emma Watson, the protagonist of The Watsons, an unfinished novel by Jane Austen
 Emma Watson: The Watsons Completed, a completion of Austen's novel by Joan Aiken
 Emma Watson, a character in Tess Gerritsen's 1999 novel Gravity
 Emma Watson, a recurring character in the American TV series The Andy Griffith Show